This is a list of candidates for the 2014 Victorian state election. The election was held on 29 November 2014.

At the close of nominations on 14 November 2014, there were a total of 896 candidates in the election (a 26 per cent increase to the 711 candidates in the 2010 election). There were 545 candidates contesting the 88 seats of the Victorian Legislative Assembly (up from 501, an 8.6 per cent increase); and 351 candidates contesting the 40 seats in the Legislative Council (up from 206, a 68 per cent increase).

Redistribution and seat changes
A redistribution of Victoria's state electoral boundaries was finalised on 17 October 2013. It saw the abolition of the Labor seats of Ballarat East, Ballarat West, Clayton, Derrimut, Keilor and Lyndhurst; the Liberal seats of Doncaster, Kilsyth, Mitcham, Scoresby and Seymour; and the Nationals seats of Benalla, Murray Valley, Rodney and Swan Hill.

The fifteen seats created to replace the fifteen abolished seats were the notionally Labor seats of Buninyong, Clarinda, Keysborough, St Albans, Sunbury, Sydenham and Werribee; the notionally Liberal seats of Croydon, Eildon, Ringwood, Rowville and Wendouree; and the Nationals seats of Euroa, Murray Plains and Ovens Valley. In addition, the Labor-held seats of Bellarine, Monbulk, Ripon and Yan Yean became notionally Liberal.

The member for Ballarat East, Geoff Howard (Labor), contested Buninyong.
The member for Ballarat West, Sharon Knight (Labor), contested Wendouree.
The member for Clayton, Hong Lim (Labor), contested Clarinda.
The member for Derrimut, Telmo Languiller (Labor), contested Tarneit.
The member for Doncaster, Mary Wooldridge (Liberal), contested the Legislative Council region of Eastern Metropolitan.
The member for Eltham, Steve Herbert (Labor), contested the Legislative Council region of Northern Victoria.
The member for Keilor, Natalie Hutchins (Labor), contested Sydenham.
The member for Kilsyth, David Hodgett (Liberal), contested Croydon.
The member for Lyndhurst, Martin Pakula (Labor), contested Keysborough.
The member for Mitcham, Dee Ryall (Liberal), contested Ringwood.
The member for Murray Valley, Tim McCurdy (Nationals), contested Ovens Valley.
The member for Rodney, Paul Weller (Nationals), contested the Legislative Council region of Northern Victoria.
The member for Scoresby, Kim Wells (Liberal), contested Rowville.
The member for Seymour, Cindy McLeish (Liberal), contested Eildon.
The member for Swan Hill, Peter Walsh (Nationals), contested Murray Plains.
The member for Tarneit, Tim Pallas (Labor), contested Werribee.
Northern Metropolitan MLC Matthew Guy (Liberal) contested Bulleen.

Retiring MPs

Labor
 Ann Barker MLA (Oakleigh) – announced 25 November 2013
 Liz Beattie MLA (Yuroke) – announced 25 November 2013
 Christine Campbell MLA (Pascoe Vale) – announced 13 November 2013
 Joanne Duncan MLA (Macedon) – announced 4 November 2013
 Joe Helper MLA (Ripon) – announced 3 December 2012
 Justin Madden MLA (Essendon) – announced 15 November 2013
 John Pandazopoulos MLA (Dandenong) – announced 26 November 2013
 Ian Trezise MLA (Geelong) – announced 3 February 2014
 Kaye Darveniza MLC (Northern Victoria) – announced 29 November 2013
 John Lenders MLC (Southern Metropolitan) – announced 18 November 2013
 Marg Lewis MLC (Northern Victoria) – appointed to a casual vacancy but did not contest preselection
Johan Scheffer MLC (Eastern Victoria)
 Matt Viney MLC (Eastern Victoria) – announced 15 November 2013

Liberal
 Ted Baillieu MLA (Hawthorn) – announced 22 August 2014
 Nicholas Kotsiras MLA (Bulleen) – announced 12 January 2014
 Andrew McIntosh MLA (Kew) – announced 17 December 2013
 Ken Smith MLA (Bass) – announced 13 January 2014
 Andrea Coote MLC (Southern Metropolitan) – announced 19 January 2014
David Koch MLC (Western Victoria) – announced 14 March 2014
Jan Kronberg MLC (Eastern Metropolitan) – announced 19 March 2014

National

 Hugh Delahunty MLA (Lowan) – announced 10 February 2014
 Jeanette Powell MLA (Shepparton) – announced 8 February 2014
 Bill Sykes MLA (Benalla) – announced 9 January 2014

Legislative Assembly
Sitting members are shown in bold text. Successful candidates are highlighted in the relevant colour. Where there is possible confusion, an asterisk (*) is also used.

Legislative Council
Sitting members are shown in bold text. Tickets that elected at least one MLC are highlighted in the relevant colour. Successful candidates are identified by an asterisk (*).

Eastern Metropolitan
The Labor Party was defending two seats. The Liberal Party was defending three seats.

Eastern Victoria
The Labor Party was defending two seats. The Liberal/National Coalition was defending three seats.

Northern Metropolitan
The Labor Party was defending two seats. The Liberal Party was defending two seats. The Greens were defending one seat.

Northern Victoria
The Labor Party was defending two seats. The Liberal/National Coalition was defending three seats.

South Eastern Metropolitan
The Labor Party was defending three seats. The Liberal Party was defending two seats.

Southern Metropolitan
The Labor Party was defending one seat. The Liberal Party was defending three seats. The Greens were defending one seat.

Western Metropolitan
The Labor Party was defending two seats. The Liberal Party was defending two seats. The Greens were defending one seat.

Western Victoria
The Labor Party was defending two seats. The Liberal/National Coalition was defending three seats.

Unregistered parties and groups
A number of parties without registration with the Victorian Electoral Commission nonetheless endorsed candidates, who appeared on the ballot paper as independents:
The Australian Democrats endorsed Clive Jackson and Richard Brummet for Southern Metropolitan Region.
The Australian Restoration Party endorsed Jacqueline Rose in Morwell.
The Australian Stable Population Party endorsed Steven Armstrong in Albert Park.
The Save the Planet Party endorsed Dean O'Callaghan in Brunswick, Reade Smith in Frankston, Jordan Crook in Monbulk, Bryony Edwards in Northcote and Tiffany Harrison in Northern Metropolitan Region.
The Socialist Party endorsed Stephen Jolly in Richmond.

See also
2014 Victorian state election
Members of the Victorian Legislative Assembly, 2010–2014
Members of the Victorian Legislative Council, 2010–2014
Members of the Victorian Legislative Assembly, 2014–2018
Members of the Victorian Legislative Council, 2014–2018

References

Green, Antony. Australian Broadcasting Corporation Election Guide
Australian Greens Victoria. 2014 State Election Preselection Noticeboard

Victoria
Candidates for Victorian state elections